Mabel Gweneth Humphreys was a Canadian-American mathematician and Professor of Mathematics at Randolph-Macon Women's College.
The M. Gweneth Humphreys Award of the Association for Women in Mathematics was established in her honor.

Education 
Humphreys attended North Vancouver High School from 1925 to 1928.
She received her Bachelor of Arts with honors in mathematics from the University of British Columbia in 1932, where she held scholarships for all four years.
She studied at Smith College under Neil McCoy, Susan Miller Rambo, and Ruth G. Wood, and she received a master's degree in mathematics in 1933.

She received her Ph.D. in mathematics from the University of Chicago in 1935.
Her dissertation was entitled On the Waring Problem with Polynomial Summands and her advisor was Leonard Eugene Dickson.

Career 
In 1981, Humphreys described her first attempts to find a job after completing her Ph.D.:

From 1935 to 1936, Humphreys was an instructor of mathematics and physics at Mount St. Scholastica College.
She began teaching at H. Sophie Newcomb Memorial College in 1936 and was promoted to assistant professor in 1941.
She was also an assistant professor at Barnard College in the summer of 1944, and an assistant professor at Tulane University in the summer of 1946.

In 1949, Humphreys became an associate professor at Randolph-Macon Women's College.
After one year at Randolph-Macon, she was named Gillie A. Larew Professor and head of the mathematics department.
She was head of the department until 1979.
For the 1955-1956 academic year, Humphreys went on sabbatical leave to the University of British Columbia (UBC).
During this time, she visited undergraduate mathematics programs at several colleges and universities to examine their methods.
From 1962 to 1963 she was a visiting professor at UBC as a National Science Foundation (NSF) faculty fellow.

In the summers, Humphreys taught high school teachers at NSF summer institutes.
From 1965 to 1969, Humphreys worked for the Educational Testing Service.
She was also a consultant in 1975 for the American Council on Education regarding mathematics course credit given by nonacademic organizations.
Humphreys was an active member of the Mathematical Association of America at both the sectional and national levels.

Awards and legacy 
Humphreys earned the Governor General's Gold Medal in 1932, which was awarded to the college student with the highest grade point average in Canada.

The M. Gweneth Humphreys Award of the Association for Women in Mathematics is named in her honor. Each year, this award is presented to a mathematics educator who has encouraged women undergraduates to pursue mathematical careers.

Personal life 
Humphreys was born on October 22, 1911 in South Vancouver, British Columbia.
Her mother, Mabel Jane Thomas (1885-1963), was born in London, England and worked as a dressmaker and a florist.
Her father was Richard Humphreys (1880-1969), a machinist who was born in Pwllheli in Northwest Wales.
Her parents were married in 1910, and Humphreys was their only child.

In 1941, Humphreys became a naturalized U.S. citizen.

Humphreys' hobbies included gardening and reading.
She was an active member of the Natural Bridge Appalachian Trail Club.
She lived in Lynchburg, Virginia through her retirement in 1980 until her death on October 6, 2006.

References

External links 
Honoring American Women in Mathematics: Pre-World War II PhD’s (Smithsonian National Museum of American History)

20th-century Canadian mathematicians
Canadian women mathematicians
Number theorists
Randolph–Macon College faculty
University of Chicago alumni
University of British Columbia alumni
Smith College alumni
1911 births
2006 deaths
20th-century women mathematicians
20th-century Canadian women scientists
Canadian emigrants to the United States